Bealeyia is a monotypic genus of Polynesian araneomorph spiders in the family Orsolobidae containing the single species, Bealeyia unicolor. It was first described by Raymond Robert Forster & Norman I. Platnick in 1985, and is only found in New Zealand.

See also
 List of Orsolobidae species

References

Monotypic Araneomorphae genera
Orsolobidae
Spiders of New Zealand
Taxa named by Raymond Robert Forster
Endemic spiders of New Zealand